or  is an old province of Japan that is now Nagano Prefecture.

Shinano bordered on Echigo, Etchū, Hida, Kai, Kōzuke, Mikawa, Mino, Musashi, Suruga, and Tōtōmi Provinces. The ancient capital was located near modern-day Matsumoto, which became an important city of the province.

The World War II–era Japanese aircraft carrier Shinano was named after this old province.

Historical record
In 713, the road that traverses Mino and Shinano provinces was widened to accommodate increasing numbers of travelers through the Kiso District of modern Nagano Prefecture.

In the Sengoku period, Shinano Province was often split among fiefs and castle towns developed, including Komoro, Ina, and Ueda. Shinano was one of the major centers of Takeda Shingen's power during his wars with Uesugi Kenshin and others.

Suwa taisha was designated as the chief Shinto shrine (ichinomiya) for the province.

In 1871, during the Meiji period, with the abolition of the han system and the establishment of prefectures (Haihan Chiken) after the Meiji Restoration, Shinano Province's ex-domains/1871 prefectures and ex-shogunate territories/1868 prefectures (mainly Ina [merger of several shogunate demesne administrations with parts of Matsumoto], Okutono, Iwamurada, Komoro, Ueda, Matsushiro, Suzaka, Iiyama, Suwa/Takashima, Takatō, Iida, Matsumoto) and Takayama/Hida which covered Hida Province were administratively merged into Nagano (initially Nakano Prefecture in 1870) and Chikuma prefectures. The seat of the prefectural government of Nakano was Nakano town from Takai District (became Nakano City in 1954), Nagano's prefectural capital was Nagano town in Minochi District (→Nagano City in 1897), and Chikuma's capital was Matsumoto town, Chikuma district (Matsumoto City from 1907). In the second wave of prefectural mergers in 1875/76, Chikuma was split again: the Western part covering Hida Province was merged into Gifu, and the Eastern part in Shinano became part of Nagano. Since that time, Nagano is essentially contiguous to Shinano.

Historical districts
Shinano Province contained the following districts:
 Nagano Prefecture
 Azumi District (安曇郡)
 Kitaazumi District (北安曇郡)
 Minamiazumi District (南安曇郡) – dissolved
 Chiisagata District (小県郡)
 Chikuma District (筑摩郡)
 Higashichikuma District (東筑摩郡)
 Nishichikuma District (西筑摩郡) – renamed as Kiso District (木曽郡) on May 1, 1968
 Hanishina District (埴科郡)
 Minochi District (水内郡)
 Kamiminochi District (上水内郡)
 Shimominochi District (下水内郡)
 Saku District (佐久郡)
 Kitasaku District (北佐久郡)
 Minamisaku District (南佐久郡)
 Sarashina District (更級郡) – dissolved
 Takai District (高井郡)
 Kamitakai District (上高井郡)
 Shimotakai District (下高井郡)
 Former Suwa Province districts
 Ina District (伊那郡)
 Kamiina District (上伊那郡)
 Shimoina District (下伊那郡)
 Suwa District (諏訪郡)

See also
 Tomono clan
 Iiyama Domain 
 Suzaka Domain 
 Matsushiro Domain 
 Ueda Domain 
 Komoro Domain 
 Matsumoto Domain  
 Okutono Domain  
 Suwa Domain 
 Takatō Domain 
 Ōhama Domain

Notes

References
 Nussbaum, Louis-Frédéric and Käthe Roth. (2005).  Japan encyclopedia. Cambridge: Harvard University Press. ; .
 
 Titsingh, Isaac. (1834).  Annales des empereurs du Japon (Nihon Ōdai Ichiran).  Paris: Royal Asiatic Society, Oriental Translation Fund of Great Britain and Ireland. .

External links 

 Murdoch's map of provinces, 1903
 Hokusai,  A View of Mount Fuji across Lake Suwa, c. 1831
 Ishida Satoshi: Maps of prefectures in Central Japan after the first wave of prefectural mergers 1871/72, after the second wave 1875/76; List of early Meiji prefectures and domains in the provinces of Central Japan during the "ex-shogunate city prefectures/feudal domains/prefectures threefold administrative system" (-fu/-han/-ken sanchisei)

 
Former provinces of Japan
History of Nagano Prefecture